Vigilante (Vigilant) is the eleventh and last studio album by the duo Colón - Lavoe, it was recorded in 1982 as part of the soundtrack of the homonymous film and published in 1983 by the Fania Records label. The album was produced by Willie Colón and had Héctor Lavoe as a singer, on this album the songs "Juanito Alimaña" stood out, which tells the story of a thief who, since he was a child, was influenced by bad habits in his neighborhood and ended up becoming a thief who terrorizes anyone who tries to put him in jail, also contains the single "Triste y Vacía".

Background 
It was recorded in 1982, in order to be part of the soundtrack of the film of the same name, Vigilante, and in the process relaunch Lavoe who had been going through an uncertain point in his career due to his personal problems and drug addiction. For this, the directors of the Fania label decided to reunite the Colón-Lavoe duo, who had already achieved success in previous years. The songs did not go on sale that year due to Jerry Masucci's ambitious proposal to first release the film The Last Fight, starring Rubén Blades and Willie Colón, which would practically cost him the salsa empire created since the mid-1960s. The film did not see great sales unlike the album, which could finally be published in 1983 and achieved the goal of putting Héctor Lavoe back on radio stations.

Track listing 
Triste y Vacía	Luis López Cabán	Héctor Lavoe	6:05
Vigilante	Willie Colón	Willie Colón	12:23
Juanito Alimaña	C. Curet Alonso	Héctor Lavoe	7:34
Pasé la Noche Fumando	Willie Colón / C. Curet Alonso	Héctor Lavoe y Willie Colón	11:34

References

Musicians 
Voices - Héctor Lavoe, Willie Colón

Choirs - Willie Colón, Milton Cardona, Graciela Carriquí, Gabriel Arnon, Doris Eugenio

Trombones - Leopoldo Pineda, Lewis Khan and Luis López (in Vigilante)

Congas - Milton Cardona

Timbales - Johnny Almendra

Bongo - Jimmy Delgado

Piano - "Professor" Joe Torres

Bass - Salt Caves 

Maracas and Guiro - Jorge Maldonado

Cuatro - Yomo Toro (on Vigilante and Pasé La Noche Fumando)

Soprano Saxophone - Morris Goldberg (on Vigilante)

Guitar - Georg Wadenius (on Vigilante)

Strings - Harold Kohon's Ensemble (on Vigilante)

Credits 
Producer - Willie Colon

Recording Director - Jon Fausty

Blend - Willie Colon and Jon Fausty

Arrangements – Héctor Garrido (Sad and Empty, Vigilante), Luis Cruz (Juanito Alimaña, I Spent the Night Smoking)

Original Album Artwork – Ron Levine

Lines - Thomas Muriel

References

Héctor Lavoe albums
1983 albums
Fania Records albums